Allainville is the name of the following communes in France:

 Allainville, Eure-et-Loir, in the Eure-et-Loir department
 Allainville, Yvelines, in the Yvelines department